is the 17th single by Berryz Kobo. The single was released on July 9, 2008.

Details 
 Main vocalist: Risako Sugaya
 Minor vocalists: Miyabi Natsuyaki, Momoko Tsugunaga, Chinami Tokunaga, Maasa Sudou
 Center: Risako Sugaya

The order of members who had the most solo parts in the song to the least:  Risako Sugaya > Miyabi Natsuyaki > Momoko Tsugunaga = Chinami Tokunaga  > Maasa Sudo > Saki Shimizu = Yurina Kumai

Track listing 
  <br/ > (Composition and Lyrics: Tsunku, Arrangement: Shoichiro Hirata)
   (Composition and Lyrics: Tsunku, Arrangement: Shoichiro Hirata)
 "Yuke Yuke Monkey Dance" (Instrumental)

PV versions 
 Normal version
 Dance-shot version
 Monkey version
 Close-up version (group)
 Close-up version (one for each individual member)

References

External links 
 Yuke Yuke Monkey Dance entry on the Up-Front Works official website
 J-Ongaku:Yuke Yuke Monkey Dance
 Jpop Stop!:Yuke Yuke Monkey Dance

2008 singles
Songs written by Tsunku
Berryz Kobo songs
Song recordings produced by Tsunku
2008 songs
Piccolo Town singles
Songs about dancing